Udo, also known as U Island, is the largest of the islands included in Jeju Province. Udo, literally "Cow Island" in Hanja, has this name because of its resemblance of a cow lying down. The whole of Udo is a lava plateau and a fertile flatland where major agricultural products such as sweet potatoes, garlic, and peanuts are produced. There is a parasitic cone, called soeui meori oreum in native Korean or udubong (牛頭峰) in Hanja (both mean "Cow's Head Peak"), in the southeast.

Tourism
Udo is one of the most visited spots in Jeju Island. About a million people visit Udo every year. Thanks to the scenery, it became the location for a few Korean films. Especially, Seobinbaeksa located on the west-coast of Udo Island was created by Rhodolith, which is the only beach created by this in Korea. Udo can be reached by multiple ferries  which run from morning 8:00am till 6pm. There are many activities and car rental services on Udo Island.

Main sights
The eight kinds of scenery of Udo

 
The eight kinds of scenery of Udo, called Udopalkyeong (우도팔경/牛島八景),refer to the following: 'day and night', 'sky and ground','front and back', and 'east and west', which are the typical kinds of scenery found on Udo. 
 Juganmyeongwol (주간명월/晝間明月)
 Yahangabyum (야항어범/夜航漁帆)
 Chunjinguansan (천진관산/天津觀山)
 Jiduchungsa (지두청사/地頭靑莎)
 Jeonphomangdo (전포망도/前浦望島)
 Huhaesukbyeok (후해석벽/後海石壁)
 Dongankyeonggul (동안경굴/東岸鯨窟)
 Seobinbaeksa (서빈백사/西濱白沙)

Tourist attractions
Hongjodangoe (Coralsand beach) (홍조단괴해변/紅潮團塊海邊)
Hagosudong beach (하고수동해수욕장/河高水洞海水浴場)
Dongangyoeng cave (동안경굴/東岸鯨窟)
Udo museum

Education
Udo Island is served by Udo Elementary School Affiliated Kindergarten, Udo Elementary School, and Udo Middle School. High school commute to Jeju Island.

Notes and references

Islands of Jeju Province